Peter Edward Van Norden (born December 16, 1950) is an American actor. He is best known for his roles in Hollywood films of the 1980s and 1990s, including Police Academy 2: Their First Assignment, The Accused and The Stand, among others. Van Norden also has a prolific resume in theater as well.

Personal life 
Van Norden graduated magna cum laude from Colgate University. He is married to Wendy Van Norden. The two have a son Robert.

Filmography

Film

Television

References

External links
 
 
 PETER VAN NORDEN official website

1950 births
Male actors from New York City
American male film actors
American male television actors
Jewish American male actors
Juilliard School alumni
Living people
Colgate University alumni
20th-century American male actors
21st-century American male actors